The Utah System of Higher Education (USHE) is the public university system of the state of Utah. It includes each of the state's sixteen public institutions of higher education, including its eight technical colleges.

History
On March 21, 1969, the Utah State Legislature passed the Utah Higher Education Act of 1969, establishing the Utah System of Higher Education and its governing body, the State Board of Higher Education, to govern Utah's (at the time) nine institutions of higher learning, as well as administer the federal Higher Education Act of 1965.

In 1977, an amendment was passed to rename the board to the Utah State Board of Regents, as well as increase its membership to sixteen, with provisions for appointing of a student member. Subsequently, a 1981 amendment further increased this number to seventeen, with the seventeenth member being the Lieutenant Governor of Utah.

Today, the board consists of eighteen Utah citizens, all of whom are appointed by the Governor of Utah. Two of those members are Student Board members, one from a degree-granting public institution of higher education and the other from a technical college. Each board member is appointed to six-year staggered term, with the exception of the student board members, who are appointed to one-year terms.

In 2020, the Utah System of Technical Colleges was subsumed into the USHE, with the Utah State Board of Regents being renamed to the Utah Board of Higher Education.

Colleges and universities

Public colleges and universities

Community colleges
Salt Lake Community College — Salt Lake City
Snow College — Ephraim

Technical colleges
Bridgerland Technical College — Logan
Davis Technical College — Kaysville
Dixie Technical College — St. George
Mountainland Technical College — Lehi
Ogden–Weber Technical College — Ogden
Southwest Technical College — Cedar City
Tooele Technical College — Tooele
Uintah Basin Technical College — Roosevelt

References

External links
University of Utah Board of Regents Meeting Minutes, 1906-1969 at University of Utah Digital Library, Marriott Library Special Collections

Public education in Utah
1969 establishments in Utah
Public university systems in the United States
Educational institutions established in 1969
 USHE